Otar Javashvili (born 17 August 1993) is a Georgian professional footballer who plays for Sioni Bolnisi. Earlier in 2018, he played for Gomel in Belarus.

References

External links 
 
 

1993 births
Living people
Footballers from Tbilisi
Footballers from Georgia (country)
Association football defenders
Erovnuli Liga players
Belarusian Premier League players
Norwegian First Division players
FC WIT Georgia players
FC Zugdidi players
Arka Gdynia players
FC Slavia Mozyr players
FC Gomel players
Florø SK players
FC Gagra players
FC Chikhura Sachkhere players
FC Metalurgi Rustavi players
FC Sioni Bolnisi players
Expatriate footballers from Georgia (country)
Expatriate footballers in Poland
Expatriate footballers in Belarus
Expatriate footballers in Norway
Expatriate sportspeople from Georgia (country) in Poland
Expatriate sportspeople from Georgia (country) in Belarus
Expatriate sportspeople from Georgia (country) in Norway